Bekkjarvik is a village in Austevoll municipality in Vestland county, Norway. The village is located on the northeastern coast of the island of Selbjørn.

The village is an old trading post, with an inn that has been in operation since the 17th century.  There was also a barrel factory.  Today, the inn is still in operation and most of the economy centers around the seasonal fishing industry. Bekkjarvik Church has been located in this village since 1895. The Selbjørn Bridge runs from Bekkjarvik across a small strait to the nearby island of Huftarøy.

Famous people
Ørjan Johannessen, winner of Bocuse d’Or

References

Villages in Vestland
Austevoll